The Interview is a 2014 satirical alternate history action-comedy film co-produced and directed by Seth Rogen and Evan Goldberg in their second directorial work, following This Is the End (2013). The screenplay was written by Dan Sterling, based on a story he co-wrote with Rogen and Goldberg. The film stars Rogen and James Franco as journalists who set up an interview with North Korean leader Kim Jong-un (Randall Park), and are then recruited by the CIA to assassinate him. The film is inspired by a 2012 Vice documentary.

Rogen and Goldberg developed the idea for The Interview in the late 2000s, with Kim Jong-il as the original assassination target. In 2011, after Jong-il's death and Jong-un's succession as the North Korean leader, Rogen and Goldberg redeveloped the script with the focus on Jong-un's character. The Interview was first announced in March 2013, at the beginning of pre-production. Principal photography was in Vancouver from October to December 2013. The film was produced by Columbia Pictures, LStar Capital and Rogen and Goldberg's Point Grey Pictures, and distributed by Sony Pictures Releasing.

In June 2014, the North Korean government threatened action against the United States if Sony released the film. As a result, Sony delayed the release from October to December and reportedly re-edited the film to make it more acceptable to North Korea. In November, the computer systems of Sony were hacked by the "Guardians of Peace", a North Korean cybercrime group. The group also threatened terrorist attacks against theaters showing the film. This led to major theater chains opting not to release the film, and Sony instead releasing it for online digital rental and purchase on December 25, 2014, followed by a limited release at selected theaters the next day.

In December 2014, South Korean singer Yoon Mi-rae revealed that the film used her song "Pay Day" without permission, and that she was taking legal action. Yoon Mi-rae and her label Feel Ghood Music reached a settlement with Sony Pictures Entertainment on May 13, 2015.

The Interview grossed $40 million in digital rentals, making it Sony's most successful digital release and earned an additional $12.3 million worldwide in box office ticket sales on a $44 million budget. It received mixed reviews for its humor and subject matter, although a few critics praised the performances of Rogen, Franco, Park and Diana Bang.

Plot

Dave Skylark is the host of the talk show Skylark Tonight, where he interviews celebrities (including Eminem and Rob Lowe) mainly about personal topics. The broadcast is interrupted by news reports about North Korea concerning its leader Kim Jong-un and the nuclear weapons. After Skylark and his crew celebrate producer Aaron Rapaport's 1,000th episode, Rapaport is upset by a producer peer, who criticizes the show as not being a real news program. He voices his concern to Skylark, urging change. Skylark agrees and later discovers that Kim Jong-un is a fan of their show, prompting Rapaport to arrange an interview for him. Traveling to the outskirts of Dandong, China, to receive instructions from the North Korean chief propagandist Sook-yin Park, Rapaport accepts the interview on behalf of Skylark.

Following Rapaport's return, CIA agent Lacey shows up, requesting they assassinate Kim with a transdermal strip of ricin via handshake to prevent the country from launching a nuclear missile at the West Coast; they reluctantly agree. Skylark carries the strip inside a pack of gum. Upon arrival in Pyongyang, they are greeted by Sook and taken to the palace. They are introduced to Kim's personal security officers Koh and Yu who are immediately suspicious of the duo; when Koh finds the strip, he chews it, mistaking it for gum. After making a secret request for help, Lacey airdrops them two more strips via an UAV, but to get it back to their room, Rapaport has to evade a Siberian tiger and hide the container in his rectum before getting caught by security.

The next day, Skylark meets Kim and spends the day playing basketball, hanging out, riding in his personal tank and partying with escorts. Kim convinces Skylark that he is misunderstood as both a cruel dictator and a failed administrator, and they become friends. At a state dinner, Koh has a seizure from the ricin poisoning, accidentally shooting Yu before dying. The next morning, Skylark feels guilty, discarding one of the ricin strips and thwarts Rapaport's attempt to poison Kim with the second strip. After a dinner mourning the deaths of the bodyguards, Skylark witnesses Kim's malicious self as he threatens war against South Korea, the West and everyone who tries to undermine him. Skylark leaves and discovers that a nearby grocery store is fake, realizing Kim has been lying to him. At the same time, during an attempt to seduce Rapaport (who still has the ricin strip on his hand), Sook reveals she despises Kim and apologizes for defending the regime. Skylark returns and tries to get Sook's support to assassinate Kim, but she disagrees, suggesting to instead ruin his cult of personality and show the North Korean people the dire state of the country. The trio secretly devise a plan to expose him on air and arm themselves with guns. Before the broadcast begins, Kim gives Skylark a puppy as a symbol of their friendship.

During the internationally televised interview with Kim, Skylark addresses increasingly sensitive topics (including the country's food shortage and US-imposed economic sanctions) and challenges his need for his father's approval. Meanwhile, Sook and Rapaport take over the control booth to fend off Kim's guards trying to cut off the broadcast. Despite his initial resistance, Kim eventually cries uncontrollably, soiling himself after Skylark sings "Firework" by Katy Perry (knowing of Kim's fondness of her music), ruining his reputation. Enraged at Skylark's betrayal, Kim shoots him and vows to get revenge by launching the nuclear missile. Skylark, whose bulletproof vest saves him, regroups with Rapaport and Sook to escape (alongside the puppy) with the help of a guard. The trio hijacks Kim's tank to get to their pickup point, killing several more guards in the process. Kim chases the group in a helicopter but is shot down and killed by Skylark before he can issue the command to launch the missile.

With the missile launch thwarted, Sook guides Skylark and Rapaport to an escape route, explaining that she has to return to Pyongyang to maintain security. The two are later rescued by SEAL Team Six officers disguised as North Korean soldiers. Back in the US, Skylark writes a book about his experience in North Korea, Rapaport returns to work as a producer (and maintains contact with Sook via Skype), while North Korea becomes a denuclearized democracy with Sook as an interim leader.

Cast
 James Franco as Dave Skylark
 Seth Rogen as Aaron Rapaport
 Lizzy Caplan as Agent Lacey
 Randall Park as Kim Jong-un
 Diana Bang as Sook-yin Park
 Timothy Simons as Malcolm
 Reese Alexander as Agent Botwin
 Anders Holm as Jake
 Charles Rahi Chun as General Jong
 Ben Schwartz as Darryl

The film also features cameo appearances from Eminem, Rob Lowe, Bill Maher, Seth Meyers, Joseph Gordon-Levitt, Song Kang-ho, Brian Williams and Scott Pelley. Iggy Azalea, Nicki Minaj, Emma Stone, Zac Efron and Guy Fieri appear in the title graphic card for Skylark Tonight.

Production

Development
Seth Rogen and Evan Goldberg developed the idea for The Interview in the late 2000s, joking about what would happen if a journalist was required to assassinate a world leader.
Initially, screenwriter Dan Sterling wrote his script involving a fictional dictator from a fictional country, but Rogen, Goldberg and Sony executives asked him to rewrite the script focusing on Kim. The screenplay was then titled Kill Kim Jong Un. Previous iterations of the story revolved around Kim Jong-il, but put the project on hold until Jong-il died and his son Kim Jong-un assumed power in 2011. Development resumed when Rogen and Goldberg realized that Jong-un is closer to their own age, which they felt would be more humorous. To write the story, co-written with Daily Show writer Dan Sterling, they researched meticulously by reading non-fiction books and watching video footage about North Korea. The script was later reviewed by an employee in the State Department. Rogen and Goldberg aimed to make the project more relevant and satirical than their previous films while retaining toilet humor. They were pleased when former NBA star Dennis Rodman visited North Korea, as it reinforced their belief that the premise of the film was realistic.

Pre-production
In March 2013, it was announced that Rogen and Goldberg would direct a comedy film for Columbia Pictures in which Rogen would star alongside James Franco, with Franco playing a talk-show host and Rogen playing his producer. Rogen and Goldberg were on board to produce along with James Weaver through Point Grey Pictures, while Columbia was said to finance the $30 million budgeted film. Lizzy Caplan joined the film's cast in October 2013. Caplan signed on to play Agent Lacey, a CIA agent who tries to get Franco's character to assassinate the Kim Jong-un. Randall Park and Timothy Simons signed on to co-star later that month. Park plays the North Korean leader Kim Jong-un and Simons the director of the talk show. Park was the first to audition for the role of Kim and got the part immediately. Before filming began, Park gained 15 pounds and shaved his head to resemble Jong-un's crew cut. His role was praised by critics. Although Rogen and Goldberg wrote the character of Kim as "robotic and strict", Park instead played it "sheepish and shy", which they found more humorous. Diana Bang was cast as Sook-yin Park, for which she was well received by critics.

Filming
Principal photography on the film began in Vancouver, British Columbia, on October 10, 2013, and concluded on December 20, 2013. There are hundreds of visual effects in the film; a crowd scene at the Pyongyang airport, for example, was digitally manipulated with a shot from 22 Jump Street.

Pre-release reaction
In June 2014, The Guardian reported that the film had "touched a nerve" within the North Korean government, as they are "notoriously paranoid about perceived threats to their safety." The Korean Central News Agency (KCNA), the state news agency of North Korea, reported that their government promised "stern" and "merciless" retaliation if the film was released. KCNA said that the release of a film portraying the assassination of the North Korean leader would not be allowed and it would be considered the "most blatant act of terrorism and war". The next month, North Korea's United Nations ambassador Ja Song-nam condemned the film, describing its production and distribution as "an act of war" and because of Kim's assassination in the film, "the most undisguised sponsoring of terrorism." The Guardian described Song-nam's comments as "perfect publicity for the movie". Later in July, KCNA wrote to U.S. President Barack Obama, asking to have the film pulled. Shortly before the planned release of the film on December 25, 2014, screenwriter Dan Sterling told Creative Screenwriting: "I couldn't believe that the most infamous man in the world knew about my script – but most importantly, I would never want something I wrote to lead to some kind of humanitarian disaster. I would be horrified if anyone got hurt over this."

Release

Delay and changes
In August 2014, Sony delayed the film's release from October 10 to December 25, 2014. Sony made post-production alterations to the film to modify its portrayal of North Korea, including modifying the designs of buttons worn by characters, originally modeled after real North Korean military buttons praising the country's leaders, and cutting a portion of Kim Jong-un's death scene.

Sony Pictures Entertainment hack and threats

On November 24, 2014, an anonymous group identifying themselves as the "Guardians of Peace" hacked the computer networks of Columbia Pictures's parent company Sony Pictures Entertainment. The hackers leaked internal emails, employee records and several recent and unreleased Sony Pictures films, including Annie, Mr. Turner, Still Alice, and To Write Love on Her Arms. The North Korean government denied involvement in the hack. On December 8, the hackers leaked further materials, including a demand that Sony pull "the movie of terrorism", widely interpreted as referring to The Interview.

On December 16, 2014, the hackers threatened to attack the New York premiere of The Interview and any cinema showing the film. Two further messages were released on December 1; one, sent in a private message to Sony executives, said that the hackers would not release further information if Sony never released the film and removed it from the internet. The other, posted to Pastebin, a web application used for text storage which the Guardians of Peace had used for previous messages, stated that Sony had "suffered enough" and could release The Interview, but only if Kim Jong-un's death scene was not "too happy". The message also threatened that if Sony made another film antagonizing North Korea, the hackers "will be here ready to fight".

Distribution
The Interview was not released in Japan, as live-action comedy films do not often perform well in the market. In the Asia-Pacific region, it was released only in Australia and New Zealand.

Rogen predicted that the film would make its way to North Korea, stating that "we were told one of the reasons they're so against the movie is that they're afraid it'll actually get into North Korea. They do have bootlegs and stuff. Maybe the tapes will make their way to North Korea and cause a revolution." Business Insider reported via Free North Korea Radio that there was high demand for bootleg copies of the film in North Korea. The South Korean human rights organizations Fighters for a Free North Korea and Human Rights Foundation, largely made up of North Korean defectors, planned to distribute DVD copies of The Interview via balloon drops. The groups had previously air-dropped offline copies of the Korean Wikipedia into North Korea on a bootable USB memory device. The balloon drop was scrapped after the North Korean government referred to the plan as a de facto "declaration of war".

Cancellation of wide theatrical release
The premiere was held in Los Angeles on December 11, 2014. The film scheduled a wide release in the UK and Ireland on February 6, 2015. Following the hackers' threats on December 16, Rogen and Franco canceled scheduled publicity appearances and Sony pulled all television advertising. The National Association of Theatre Owners said that they would not object to cinema owners delaying the film to ensure the safety of filmgoers. Shortly afterwards, the ArcLight and Carmike cinema chains announced that they would not screen the film.

On December 17, Sony canceled the New York City premiere. Later that day, other major theater chains including AMC, Cinemark, Cineplex, Regal, Southern Theatres as well as several independent movie theaters either delayed or canceled screenings of the film, which led to Sony announcing that they were scrapping the wide theatrical release of the film altogether. The chains reportedly came under pressure from shopping malls where many theaters are located, which feared that the terror threat would ruin their holiday sales. They also feared expensive lawsuits in the event of an attack; Cinemark, for instance, contended that it could not have foreseen the 2012 Aurora, Colorado shooting, which took place at one of its multiplexes, a defense that would not hold in the event of an attack at a screening of The Interview.

The cancellation also affected other films in which each films' subject matter is North Korea. An Alamo Drafthouse Cinema location in Dallas planned to hold a free screening of Team America: World Police, which satirizes Kim Jong-un's father Kim Jong-il, in place of its previously scheduled screening of The Interview; Paramount Pictures refused to permit the screening. New Regency pulled out of a planned film adaptation of the graphic novel Pyongyang starring Steve Carell; Carell declared it a "sad day for creative expression".

Sony received criticism for canceling the wide release. Guardian film critic Peter Bradshaw wrote that it was an "unprecedented defeat on American turf", but that "North Korea will find that their bullying edict will haunt them." In the Capital and Gizmodo suggested the cancellation caused a Streisand effect, whereby the attempt to remove or censor a work has the unintended consequence of publicizing it more widely. In a press conference, U.S. President Barack Obama said that though he was sympathetic to Sony's need to protect employees, he thought Sony had "made a mistake. We cannot have a society in which some dictator in some place can start imposing censorship in the United States. I wish they'd spoken to me first. I would have told them: do not get into the pattern in which you are intimidated."

According to Sony Pictures Entertainment CEO Michael Lynton, the cancellation of the wide release was a response to the refusal of cinema chains to screen the film, not the hackers' threats, and that Sony would seek other ways to distribute the film. Sony released a statement saying that the company "is and always has been strongly committed to the First Amendment… Free expression should never be suppressed by threats and extortion."

The movie was not released in Russia.

Revised release
After the wide release cancellation, Sony considered other ways to release the film, citing pressure from the film industry, theater owners, and the White House. On NBC's Meet the Press on December 21, Sony's legal counsel David Boies noted that the company was still committed to releasing the film. Sony planned a limited release for December 25, 2014, at more than three hundred American independent and arthouse cinemas. Lynton stated that Sony was trying to show the film to the largest audience by securing as many theaters as they could.

Sony released The Interview for rental or purchase in the United States through the streaming services Google Play, Xbox Video, and YouTube on December 24, 2014. It was also available for a limited time on SeeTheInterview.com, a website operated by the stealth startup Kernel.com, which Sony previously worked with to market The Fifth Wave. Within hours, The Interview spread to file sharing websites after a security hole allowed people to download rather than stream the film. TorrentFreak estimated that The Interview had been downloaded illegally via torrents at least 1.5 million times in just two days. On December 27, the North Korean National Defence Commission released a statement accusing President Obama of forcing Sony to distribute the film. The film was released on iTunes on December 28.

In the first week of January 2015, Sony announced The Interview would receive a wide theatrical release in the United Kingdom and Ireland on February 6, but it would not be distributed digitally in the UK. The film became available for streaming on Netflix on January 24.

Home media
Sony released the film on Blu-ray Disc and DVD on February 17, 2015. The home release was packaged as the "Freedom Edition", and included 90 minutes of deleted scenes, behind-the-scenes featurettes, a blooper reel, feature commentary with directors Rogen and Goldberg, and a special episode of Naked and Afraid featuring Rogen and Franco. , the film had earned over $6.7 million in sales in the U.S.

Reception

Box office and online rentals
The Interview opened to a limited release in the United States on December 25, 2014, across 331 theaters and earned over $1 million on its opening day. Variety called the opening gross "an impressive launch for a title playing in only about 300 independent theaters in the U.S." It went on to earn over $1.8 million in its opening weekend, and by the end of its run on January 25, 2015, had grossed $6.1 million at the box office.

Within four days of its online release on December 24, 2014, The Interview earned over $15 million through online rentals and purchases. It became Sony Pictures' highest-grossing online release, outselling Arbitrage ($14 million), Bachelorette ($8.2 million), and Snowpiercer ($7 million). It was the top-selling Google Play and YouTube film of 2014. By January 20, 2015, the film had earned more than $40 million from online sales and rentals.

Sony expected The Interview to break even through video-on-demand sales and saving millions of dollars on marketing. The National Association of Theatre Owners contended that Sony would lose at least $30 million due to poor box office performance.

Critical response
On review aggregation website Rotten Tomatoes, the film holds a 51% approval rating, based on 154 reviews, with an average rating of 5.70/10. The site's consensus reads: "Unfortunately overshadowed by controversy (and under-screened as a result), The Interviews screenplay offers middling laughs bolstered by its two likable leads." On Metacritic, the film has a score of 52 out of 100, based on 33 critics, indicating "mixed or average reviews".

IGN's Roth Cornet wrote that "though it's unlikely to stand out as one of the shrewdest political satires of its time, [it] is a clever, unrestrained and—most importantly—sidesplitting parody that pokes fun at both a vapid media and one of the world's most dangerous dictators." Edward Douglas of ComingSoon.net said the film was "hilarious, but it will probably get us nuked." Jordan Hoffman of The Guardian gave the film three out of five stars and wrote that "if this unessential but agreeable movie really triggered an international response, this is life reflecting art in a major way."

Scott Foundas of Variety panned the film as "cinematic waterboarding" and "about as funny as a communist food shortage, and just as protracted", but praised the performances of Randall Park and Diana Bang. Mike Hale of The New York Times also praised Park and Bang, but wrote that "after seeing The Interview and the ruckus its mere existence has caused, the only sensible reaction is amazement at the huge disconnect between the innocuousness of the film and the viciousness of the response."

Political response
In the wake of the Sony Pictures Entertainment hack, leaks revealed e-mails between Sony Pictures Entertainment CEO Michael Lynton and RAND Corporation defense analyst Bruce Bennett from June 2014. Bennett advised against toning down The Interviews graphic Jong-un death scene, in the hope that it would "start some real thinking in South Korea and, I believe, in the North once the DVD leaks into the North". Bennett expressed his view that "the only resolution I can see to the North Korean nuclear and other threats is for the North Korean government to eventually go away", which he felt would be likeliest to occur following an assassination of Kim. Lynton replied that a senior figure in the United States Department of State agreed. Bennett responded that the office of Robert R. King, U.S. Special Envoy for North Korean Human Rights Issues, had determined that the North Korean statements had been "typical North Korean bullying, likely without follow-up".

In an interview with CNN, Bennett said Lynton sits on the board of trustees of the RAND Corporation, which had asked Bennett to talk to Lynton and give his opinion on the film. Bennett felt The Interview was "coarse" and "over the top", but that "the depiction of Kim Jong-un was a picture that needed to get into North Korea. There are a lot of people in prison camps in North Korea who need to take advantage of a change of thinking in the north." Bennett felt that if the DVD were smuggled into the country it might have an effect "over time". Bennett contacted the Special Envoy for North Korean Human Rights Issues, a personal friend of his, who "took the standard government approach: we don't tell industry what to do". Jen Psaki, then a spokesperson for the United States Department of State, confirmed that Daniel R. Russel, the U.S. Assistant Secretary of State for East Asian and Pacific Affairs, had spoken to Sony executives; she reiterated that "entertainers are free to make movies of their choosing, and we are not involved in that".

North Korean state media threatened "merciless" retaliation for his depiction in the film. Seth Rogen responded, "People don't usually wanna kill me for one of my movies until after they've paid 12 bucks for it."

Legacy
In Greece, in April 2017, the film's opening scene, depicting a young girl reciting a poem with hate speech, was mistakenly broadcast in the news bulletin of Alpha TV and the news program Live News on Epsilon TV, as a real-life provocative event against the United States. In response to the backlash on various online newspapers, Antonis Sroiter and Nikos Evangelatos, the hosts of the said programs, apologized in posts they made on their social accounts.

See also

 Assassinations in fiction
 Team America: World Police, another comedy film satirizing North Korea
 The Dictator, a comedy film satirizing Middle Eastern dictators

Notes

References

External links
 
 
 
 
 

2014 films
2014 controversies
2014 controversies in the United States
Film controversies in the United States
2010s buddy comedy films
2010s adventure comedy films
2010s political comedy films
2014 black comedy films
2014 action comedy films
2010s satirical films
American buddy comedy films
American satirical films
American action comedy films
American adventure comedy films
American black comedy films
American political comedy films
American political satire films
Fiction about assassinations
Columbia Pictures films
Point Grey Pictures films
Cultural depictions of Kim Jong-un
Events relating to freedom of expression
2010s Korean-language films
Films scored by Henry Jackman
Films about assassinations
Films about the Central Intelligence Agency
Films critical of communism
Films directed by Evan Goldberg
Films directed by Seth Rogen
Films produced by Seth Rogen
Films with screenplays by Seth Rogen
Films set in 2014
Films set in China
Films set in Manhattan
Films set in Virginia
Films set in Nevada
Films set in Pyongyang
Films set in North Korea
Films set in South Korea
Films shot in Vancouver
Mass media-related controversies in the United States
North Korea–United States relations
Film controversies
Self-censorship
Political controversies in film
Political controversies
Political controversies in the United States
Films about journalism
Censored films
Films produced by Evan Goldberg
Films with screenplays by Evan Goldberg
2010s English-language films
2010s American films